Pari is a 2018 Indian supernatural horror film directed by Prosit Roy in his debut. It stars Anushka Sharma and marks her 3rd production venture for her company Clean Slate Filmz. Parambrata Chatterjee, Ritabhari Chakraborty, Rajat Kapoor and Mansi Multani feature in supporting roles. Production on the film began in June 2017 and it released theatrically on 2 March 2018.

Plot 

The story revolves around the demon Ifrit and Auladhchakra, a satanic cult in Bangladesh aiming to perpetuate the bloodline of Ifrit. They used to kidnap women and summon the demon to rape them so that they could be impregnated with the offsprings of the demon. Professor Qasim Ali  used to head a group of vigilantes that sought out the women impregnated by Ifrit, kept them captive until they gave birth, then immediately killed the demonic babies by cutting off their heads and sealing them within glass jars. This drew opposition from the villagers despite the support and the group was shut down due to their violently radical approach. Rukhsana is the daughter of one such woman, who was a victim of the satanic ritual but escaped her captivity before Professor Ali could kill her child.

Arnab is a young man who runs a printing press. Piyali, a nurse, is set for an arranged marriage with him. On the way home in the heavy rain, he and his parents accidentally hit an old woman. The woman dies and when the police searches her home, an old hut in the forest, they find a dirty Rukhsana chained inside. Arnab, feeling sympathetic and responsible upon realising she has no one, takes her in. Rukhsana knows nothing of the modern outside world and often sees demonic visions that frighten her. Arnab finds her strange but endearing. As the two spend time together, she falls in love with him. A mortuary assistant discovers that Rukhsana's mother has the cult's mark on her skin and informs Professor Ali, who has been searching for Rukhsana for years.

One night, Rukhsana gets sick. Though Arnab mistakes it for her period, the truth is that her body needs to spew out the poison it produces every month due to her demon blood. She secretly kills a dog by biting it and releasing her poison. She later admits that she loves Arnab and the two make love. The next morning, Professor Ali confronts Arnab with the truth about her, but he refuses to believe him. The morgue assistant fights Arnab, injuring him. Rukhsana kills the assistant in retaliation and gets between Arnab and Piyali, feeling jealous. When Arnab argues with her, she grabs him by the throat and lifts him clear off the ground.

Disturbed, Arnab realises that Professor Ali was right and researches about Ifrit. He learns that Ifrit babies are born in one month instead of nine. Arnab contacts Professor Ali. Just as he arrives with his men, Rukhsana reveals to Arnab that she is pregnant. The professor's men tie her up and torture her so that she dies of her own poison. Though she cries for Arnab, he leaves, depressed. After three weeks, Piyali visits Arnab at his parents' house and he tells her the truth about Rukhsana. His conversation with her makes him realise he shouldn't have left her to die.

Rukhsana, after being beaten repeatedly, breaks free and kills the professor before heading over to Piyali's. She injures Piyali, but goes into labor. Piyali is unable to kill her, being a nurse and with her own past of having an abortion. Instead, she helps Rukhsana deliver the baby, which has an umbilical cord. Rukhsana leaves the baby to her and disappears. Arnab rushes to the old hut, where he finds her near death. He cries and hugs her. She resists the urge to bite him and release her poison, instead letting it remain inside her body. Before dying, she tells Arnab that the baby is human. At the end, Arnab says that Rukhsana's love made the baby human, rather than Ifrit's hatred.

Cast
Anushka Sharma as Rukhsana 
Parambrata Chatterjee as Arnab
Rajat Kapoor as Professor Qasim Ali
Ritabhari Chakraborty as Piyali
Mansi Multani as Kalapori
Mithu Chakrabarty as Arnab's mother
Rohit KaduDeshmukh as Arnab's friend
Santilal Mukherjee as Police Inspector
Dibyendu Bhattacharya as Morgue worker
Arijit Dutta
Sraboni Biswas
Aasif Khan as Ismail (cameo).

Marketing
The first look of Pari was released on 13 June 2017 by Sharma via her Twitter handle. The film's motion poster, promotionally called Screamer, was released on 9 January 2018, showing the face of Sharma's character getting bruised. A 30-second clip, the second "screamer", was released on 3 February 2018, which showed Sharma watching a cartoon on television with an idyllic smile, giving the impression that she is safe and okay. However, the camera pans to show that her hands and feet are bruised, and she is chained to the bed. The official teaser of Pari was released on 7 February 2018 by Sharma via her Twitter handle. The third screamer, released on Valentine's Day, opens with Anushka and Parambrata's characters watching television when Anushka says "I love you" to him. She becomes disturbed when she hears an eerie female voice respond, "I love you too." The camera pans to show a bloody and battered version of herself, grinning and terrifying the real Anushka. The official trailer of Pari was released one day later, on 15 February 2018. After the trailer, two other screamers have been released.

Controversies
During the shooting of the film in August 2017 at Basanti State Highway, 24 Pgs. (S) district of West Bengal, a technician was electrocuted. The shooting of the film was immediately stopped but was started again after a while.

The film has been banned in Pakistan for allegedly promoting black magic, some non-Islamic values and anti-Muslim sentiments.

Music

The music of Pari was composed by Anupam Roy while the lyrics were written by Anvita Dutt.

Reception

Critical response

Positive reviews gave a definite praise for Anushka's performance and praised the makers for doing a movie on this genre.
While Renuka Vyavahare of TOI called it “Anushka’s strongest work as an actor-producer so far”, she also went on to add that, “Pari has the ability to redefine the genre as it’s refreshingly different, atmospheric and moody”.
Rajeev Masand of News18 gave the film a rating of 2 out of 5 saying that, "Pari, co-produced by and starring Anushka Sharma, is a competently made film that’s rich in atmospherics.”, but he went onto conclude that “Pari doesn’t come together in a coherent, satisfying way. What starts out interestingly, ends in a mess."
Rohit Bhatnagar of Deccan Chronicle stated: “Pari is a delightful treat to those who are fond of horror flicks. And stop complaining that Bollywood doesn't produce good horror films!”
Koimoi reviewed Pari as “one of the best to come out of this genre”. As a last word they added: “Hollywood, please take out the notepad and write down the stuff from Pari on how to make a non-clichéd horror film. Surely one of the best in this genre & a must watch for the fans. Producer Anushka Sharma needs a special mention to make this possible” and rated the film 3.5 out of 5. Gulf news gave the movie 3 stars out of 5 and wrote that “Anushka Sharma’s horror film is a world apart from other ghoulish Bollywood offerings, and that’s a good thing”.
 
Rohit Vats of Hindustan Times gave the film a rating of 1 out of 5 and said that, "Anushka Sharma's film Pari is a confusing tale of ghosts, ghouls, djinns and forced legitimacy. Pari appears puzzled as if they don't know how to end what they started. With 136-minute screen time, Pari doesn't head anywhere." Lakshana N Palat of India Today gave the film a rating of 2 out of 5 saying that, "The story of Pari is submerged under irrelevant scenes, jump scares, and the desperate need to fall into the horror-film category. It's a shame, because the storyline was actually quite a unique and interesting one." Shubhra Gupta of The Indian Express gave the film a rating of 1 out of 5 and concluded her review by saying that, "Anushka Sharma plays Rukhsana with a great deal of bloody enthusiasm. You cannot accuse her of not trying hard, but the film is so poorly-written, and so scatter-brained that nothing can rescue it." Saibal Chatterjee of NDTV said about the film that, "It lacks the narrative consistency that its in-your-face methods needed in order to be truly effective. In the end, the makers of Pari try way too hard. The outcome is an extended blur that leaves you dazed but totally unimpressed." and gave the film a rating of 2 out of 5.

Accolades

See also
 List of Hindi horror films

References

External links
 
 

2010s Hindi-language films
Genies in film
Indian supernatural horror films
Films shot in Kolkata
Demons in film
Indian pregnancy films
Film controversies
Film controversies in India
Film censorship in Pakistan
Film controversies in Pakistan
Obscenity controversies in film
2010s supernatural horror films
Films scored by Anupam Roy
2018 horror films
Censored films
Ifrits
Jinn in popular culture
Satanism in popular culture
Films about Satanism
The Devil in film
Films set in West Bengal
Islamic fiction